Chloral, also known as trichloroacetaldehyde or trichloroethanal, is the organic compound with the formula Cl3CCHO. This aldehyde is a colourless oily liquid that is soluble in a wide range of solvents. It reacts with water to form chloral hydrate, a once widely used sedative and hypnotic substance.

Production
Chloral was first prepared, and named, by the German chemist Justus von Liebig in 1832.  Liebig treated anhydrous ethanol with dry chlorine gas.

Chloral is produced commercially by the chlorination of acetaldehyde in the presence of hydrochloric acid, producing chloral hydrate. Ethanol can also be used as a feedstock. This reaction is catalyzed by antimony trichloride:
H3CCHO + 3 Cl2 + H2O → Cl3CCH(OH)2 + 3 HCl

The chloral hydrate is distilled from the reaction mixture. The distillate is then dehydrated with concentrated sulfuric acid, after which the heavier acid layer (containing the water) is drawn off:

Cl3CCH(OH)2 → Cl3CCHO + H2O

The resulting product is purified by fractional distillation. Small amounts of chloral hydrate occur in some chlorinated water.

Key reactions
Chloral tends to form adducts with water (to give chloral hydrate) and alcohols.

Aside from its tendency to hydrate, chloral is notable as a building block in the synthesis of DDT. For this purpose, chloral is treated with chlorobenzene in the presence of a catalytic amount of sulfuric acid:
 Cl3CCHO + 2 C6H5Cl → Cl3CCH(C6H4Cl)2 + H2O
This reaction was described by Othmar Zeidler in 1874. The related herbicide methoxychlor is also produced from chloral.

Treating chloral with sodium hydroxide gives chloroform Cl3CH and sodium formate HCOONa.
 Cl3CCHO + NaOH → Cl3CH + HCOONa

Chloral is easily reduced to trichloroethanol, which is produced in the body from chloral.

Toxicity
Chloral and chloral hydrate have the same properties biologically since the former hydrates rapidly. Chloral hydrate was routinely administered to patients on the gram scale with no lasting effects. Prolonged exposure to the vapors is toxic with a LC50 for 4-hour exposure of 440 mg/m3.

See also
Chloral cyanohydrin

References

Aldehydes
Organochlorides
GABAA receptor positive allosteric modulators
Trichloromethyl compounds